Lieutenant General Abd-Al-Minaam Khaleel (‎; 1 April 1921 – 23 March 2022) was a general in the Egyptian Army.

Khaleel was born in 1921, and graduated from the Egyptian Military Academy in 1942. He assumed command of the Egyptian 2nd Army during the Yom Kippur War, replacing Major General Saad Mamoun. He later apparently commanded the Central Military Region. He turned 100 in April 2021, and died on March 23, 2022, nine days before his 101st birthday.

Military career 
 He graduated from the Military College in May 1942
 Participated in the 1948 Palestine War, the 1956 Triple Aggression, the Yemen War 1962–1967, the 1967 War, the War of Attrition, the October 1973 War.
 Chief of Staff, Fourth Brigade, infantry
 Head of operations for Arab forces in Yemen
 Commander of the Egyptian Parachute Corps 1967
 Chief of Staff, Second Infantry Division
 Commander of the 3rd Infantry Division after the 1967 war
 Chief of Staff of the Second Army
 Commander of the Second Field Army until 1972
 Head of the Armed Forces Training Authority
 Commander of the military central region during the October War until October 16
 The commander of the second army on October 16, 1973, the period of the breach
 Assistant Minister of War and Commander of Popular and Military Defense
 Assistant Minister of War and Chairman of the Armed Forces Training Authority

References

External links 
 http://www.au.af.mil/au/awc//awcgate/milreview/yomkippur_intel.pdf

1921 births
2022 deaths
Egyptian centenarians
Egyptian generals
Egyptian Military Academy alumni
Egyptian people of the Yom Kippur War
20th-century Egyptian military personnel
Men centenarians
People from Minya Governorate